Achha Bura is a 1983 Indian Bollywood film directed by Hrishikesh Mukherjee and produced by Deepak Parashar. The film was a remake of Memdidi, directed by  Hrishikesh Mukherjee again. Lead cast were Raj Babbar and Anita Raj. It also had Amjad Khan, Ranjeet and Dina Pathak in pivotal roles.

Cast

 Raj Babbar...Ravi Lala
 Anita Raj...Rita Roy
 Amjad Khan...Mohammad Sher Khan / Kamalrup Chaurasiya "Shera"
 Ranjeet...Veer Singh / Vinay Sinha "Veer"
 Dina Pathak...Rosy
 Hari Shivdasani...Lala
 Viju Khote...Jaggu Dada
 Utpal Dutt...Dwarkaprasad Maniklal Chaurasiya

Soundtrack
All songs composed by Usha Khanna with lyrics written by Rajendra Krishan and Indeevar.
 "Aa Jaao Yahaan" - Asha Bhosle
 "Kya Aisa Ho Sakti Hai" - Asha Bhosle and Suresh Wadkar
 "Socha Nahin Achha Bura" - Jagjit Singh and Usha Mangeshkar
 "Tum Bhi Hanso" - Anwar and Suresh Wadkar

References

External links

1980s Hindi-language films
1983 films
Films directed by Hrishikesh Mukherjee
Films scored by Usha Khanna